The Dimmsville Covered Bridge was a historic covered bridge located near Dimmsville, Greenwood Township, Juniata County, Pennsylvania. It was a Burr Truss bridge.  It measures  and had vertical siding, windows at eave level, and a gable roof. It crossed Cocolamus Creek.

It was listed on the National Register of Historic Places in 1979.

The bridge collapsed on April 11, 2017 after years of neglect.

References

Covered bridges in Juniata County, Pennsylvania
Covered bridges on the National Register of Historic Places in Pennsylvania
Bridges in Juniata County, Pennsylvania
National Register of Historic Places in Juniata County, Pennsylvania
Road bridges on the National Register of Historic Places in Pennsylvania
Wooden bridges in Pennsylvania
Burr Truss bridges in the United States
2017 disestablishments in Pennsylvania